Jikme Losel Wangpo (born 1964 in Sikkim) is the 7th Dzogchen Rinpoche of Tibet in the Nyingma tradition of Tibetan Buddhism. He is the 7th reincarnation of Pema Rigdzin.

Wangpo was recognized by the high lama Dodrupchen Rinpoche and this was subsequently confirmed by Tenzin Gyatso, 14th Dalai Lama.  His enthronement ceremony took place on 8 October 1972, at Sikkim's royal palace in Gangtok.

References

External links
Biography at Dzogchen.org

1964 births
Living people
20th-century Indian educators
7th Dzogchen Rinpoche
Scholars from Sikkim